The following is a list of characters from Class of 3000, an American animated television series on Cartoon Network created and produced by André 3000 of the hip hop group OutKast. He also starred as superstar and music teacher Sunny Bridges. The show was set in Atlanta's fictitious middle school called Westley School of Performing Arts.

Main

Sunny Bridges
The hometown hero of Lil' D, Sunny is a musical genius who left Georgia to become a recording artist. Over the years in the employment of his money-grabbing manager, however, he lost his passion for music and returned to his old neighborhood. He intended to go into permanent retirement; instead, Lil' D convinces him to become the new music teacher at the Westley School of Performing Arts. Sunny is devoted to his students, but he is forced to keep a low profile in order to avoid media attention. Sunny is known to have a crush on Leela Lopez. While he can play many instruments, his favorite is the saxophone.  He has mentioned that he owns over 65,000 shirts. His shoe closet was also mentioned to be able to be seen from space. Sunny's character is strongly based on the show's creator and 
actor.

Lil' D
Lil' Dwight "D Evil" the Devil proclaims himself as the unofficial/bumbling leader of the Westley School's music class, whether they like it or not. He is bright, talented, confident to a fault, and is incredibly tenacious when it comes to music. Through sheer determination (as well as breaking and entering), he manages to recruit Sunny Bridges as the class's new music teacher. Although Li'l D considers himself remarkably streetwise, his overconfidence often leads him into trouble. He is considered the shortest member of the class (despite being taller than Kim and Eddie if not for his hair), standing about 4'6".

Lil' D has never met his father, although he doesn't seem bothered by it. He likes to say, "Then it's settled." after he thinks that a plan was agreed upon (whether or not it actually was) which usually results in something horrible happening, and on occasion he will say "Let's crank this thang up!" His instrument is the drums. In some songs, he plays a different instrument like in "The Hunt for Red Blobtober". Although he has never revealed his actual name, no one seems to notice. He is 12 years old. He is voiced by Sylvia "Small Fire" Holloway.

Madison Spaghettini Papadopoulos
She wears a colorful dress, pink bracelet, necklace and white headband. She is an extremely optimistic hippie. She is perpetually happy, no matter true circumstance, though she is occasionally shown to reach a breaking point and cry as shown in the episode "Am I Blue?". She enjoys the company of animals and baby creatures. She has a secret crush on Lil D. Her parents are never shown like all the other children. She constantly displays a bubbly personality. She claims her hair has the special ability of getting frizzy whenever love is in the air. In the pilot episode, she mentions that she has a grandmother who is of Colombian descent. However, her last name suggests she is of Greek descent. Her instrument is the high-pitched violin, but in the game Funk Box, she also plays a cello. She is 12 years old. The character is voiced by Jennifer Hale.

Tamika Jones
Aloof Tamika makes it her business to keep the other students in line, giving her the title of "Toughest Girl in School". She is also extremely stubborn; the slightest misstep is grounds for a threatening fist. "Prove it or move it" is her trademark phrase, but she is not sure what to do if someone chooses "prove it." Despite her sharp tongue and cold disposition, Tamika shares a close bond with her classmates and will protect them as often as she teases them. Eddie is in love with her. Her instrument is the harp. In the song "Throwdown", she also says she plays the guitar. But in the episode "Tamika and the Beast" she shows a soft and sensitive side. She is usually disgusted by Eddie's attempts for her affection, although she showed feelings to him in the show's Christmas special after he paid Santa Claus to visit her. She is 12 years old. She is voiced by Crystal Scales.

Edward "Eddie" Phillip James Lawrence III
The richest kid in the school, being the heir to the Lawrence fortune (according to the first episode, his father is the head of the Earth division of Cola Cola). A cultured aristocrat, he has something of a high-and-mighty attitude concerning the other students, naively believing that all problems can be solved with money; he uses his wealth to help his friends.  He is not completely spoiled, either.  When Philly Phil's machine tells him he should never have a job because his dad is rich, Eddie says, "But I want to get a job!" He is the only character to have ten fingers at any time (he will usually have eight, but for at least one scene he has had 10. Eddie's explanation for his 10 fingers is that it is due to his wealth). He is in love with Tamika, as suggested in Home and Westley Side Story and confirmed by Tamika in Love is in the Hair...Net. Eddie has spoken of having Swiss ancestry. His instrument is the clarinet, but in the game funkbox he also plays a trumpet.  He also plays many horns and woodwinds such as the trombone seen in The Devil and Lil'D. He is 12 years old. He speaks in a Cajun accent. Once he said that his dad owns all of the stations on TV. He is voiced by Tom Kenny.

Phillip "Philly" P. Phil
Brilliant and imaginative, tends to stand out for his unusual fashion sense. Philly Phil can invent useful devices on the spot, although they often end in malfunction. Though Li'l D and the other students do not fully understand Philly Phil's many eccentricities, they are willing to accept him as one of their own. He also might have a crush on Kim as shown in Nothin To it But to Do it. Philly Phil has an appetite for any type of food, particularly sweets such as chocolate.  His height didn't seem to be consistent from episode to episode (He was about as tall as Principal Luna in The Hunt for Red Blobtober and only a few inches taller than Madison in Funky Monkey). In Eddie's Money, he is shown to have a decent singing voice. His instrument is the double bass, also with the bass guitar. In Free Philly, it is revealed that he is very weak and needs the help of technology (Although he does save all of his classmates and Sunny at the end of the episode without any help), though in Big Robot on Campus it shows that he is fairly strong and can use his own physical strength. He is 13 years old, making him the oldest student in Sunny's class. He is voiced by Phil LaMarr.

Kim Chin
She is Kam's twin sister and his polar opposite down to even these instruments. She and Kam are the youngest of the Westley Side School First Years and she is the shortest, despite Li'l D's reputation as the "shortest member of the class". Kim sometimes feels that fashion is more of a concern than music and loves to follow fashion trends. She is very energetic, free-spirited, sometimes to the point of mischief, sleeps with a stuffed rabbit due to her fear of the dark, and loves to torment her more old-fashioned sibling. Kim and Kam's parents are never shown. She was born in Columbus, Ohio and is of Chinese American descent. Her instrument is the xylophone, also with other percussion instruments. She is presumably 12 years old. Voiced by Janice Kawaye.

Kam Chin
He is Kim's twin brother and her polar opposite, born in Columbus, Ohio and is of Chinese American descent. He and his sister are the youngest of the Westley Side School First Years and he is considered to be the smartest in school. He generally projects an air of refinement and class. Unlike the other kids, Kam has common sense and maturity and is the voice of reason, besides Sunny (but he was oblivious to Santa in the Christmas episode). However, the kids don't listen to him and do what they want instead. Kam tends to be interested in many dull things such as high-grade bread. He is very eager about learning to the point that if Sunny is late to class, his brain is hurting from not learning. Kam has an irrational fear of hang gliding into a flock of angry mallards. Kam appears to have comically terrible things happen to him at the time where he resents these things. He does not have any sweat glands (and doesn't take showers because of this, yet he always appears clean) and he goes insane whenever he is too hot, as shown in Study Buddies. His instrument is the keyboard or the piano. In "Love Is in the Hair... Net", he plays the accordion. He is presumably 12 years old. Voiced by Janice Kawaye.

Principal Luna
He is the principal at Westley School of Performing Arts. He is of Hispanic descent. He has a tendency to over-use the word "fantastic" and is always trying to make money for the school. He has a crush on the substitute lunch lady, Ms. Petunia Squatenchowder. He owns 36 out of the only known 37 of a rare type of spatula. Luna is Sunny's rival for coolness. He is voiced by Jeff Bennett.

Other

Cheddar Man
Also known as Charles, he is one of Sunny's friends. He specialises in selling cheeses, fixing helicopters, doing teeth, and being a Con Artist. He's something of a shady character and is often seen selling contraband goods and services out of his car, like "Mr. Bristle" action figures that are really used toothbrushes, and bootleg movies which he shoots and in which he plays every part. He is known to be part of Sunny's old band, the "Sunny Bridges' Funkaneers," He has also been the kids' manager in "Am I Blue?". He is voiced by Phil LaMarr.

Leela Lopez
Another teacher at Westley. She has a crush on Sunny while Sunny has love interest in her. Leela teaches the Westley modern dance class, but unfortunately always has no luck in teaching her unskillful students. Voiced by Jennifer Hale.

Petunia Squatenchowder
The new lunch lady at Westley's known for serving the grossest lunches ever. Principal Luna has a crush on her but she has developed a crush on Sunny also. Then she falls in love with Luna after a fight with Sunny. She also owns the missing 37th spatula from Principal Luna's collection. Voiced by Tom Kenny.

Jannet "Jan" Rongetes
Jan is a Swedish janitor at Westley. He is a former member of Sunny Funkaneers. He has a secret chocolate treasure. He likes to play Swedish air guitar in his free time. He also made bootleg merchandise on one occasion. Jan is always the one who has to clean up all the messes that people cause, no matter how wacko it is. He is voiced by Jeff Glen Bennett.

Bob Sulu
Sulu is the Korean American butler of Eddie's family mansion and is a typical "English Butler". He looks slim at first but actually has a very muscular body. He is voiced by Jeff Glen Bennett. His name is a reference to the Star Trek character Hikaru Sulu.

Bianca Moon
One of Sunny's friends. She owns an organic food store that smells like burnt pumpkins with a hint of honeysuckle. Sunny says that you can pay her with painted shells and shiny beads. She specializes in writing a person's name on a grain of rice. For example, Bianca has spelled "Sunny Bridges" with an L, a misspelling.

References

 Book references
 

Lists of characters in American television animation
Television characters introduced in 2006
Cartoon Network Studios characters